Julio César DePaula (born December 31, 1982 in Santo Domingo, Dominican Republic) is a Dominican professional baseball pitcher who is a free agent.

Career
He appeared in 16 games for the Minnesota Twins in the  season, pitching 20 innings total. He became a free agent at the end of the  season and signed a minor league contract with the Tampa Bay Rays on Jan. 6, .

He signed with Hanwha Eagles in South Korea on Dec. 10, . He appeared in 41 games for Eagles that season. He was released from Eagles on June 4, due to poor results. DePaula signed with the St. Paul Saints of the American Association of Independent Professional Baseball after his release. On June 26, 2014 DePaula signed a minor league contract with the Baltimore Orioles.

He signed a contract with Brother Elephants in 2015 but was released on January 10, .

DePaula signed with the York Revolution of the Atlantic League of Professional Baseball for the 2016 season.

On April 8, 2016, DePaula signed with the Rieleros de Aguascalientes of the Mexican Baseball League. He was released on April 15, 2016.

On May 27, 2017, DePaula was traded from the York Revolution to the Sugar Land Skeeters. He became a free agent after the 2017 season.

On July 24, 2018, DePaula signed with the Road Warriors of the Atlantic League of Professional Baseball. He became a free agent following the 2018 season.

References

External links

1982 births
Living people
Águilas del Zulia players
Bridgeport Bluefish players
Bowie Baysox players
Diablos Rojos del México players
Dominican Republic expatriate baseball players in Mexico
Dominican Republic expatriate baseball players in South Korea
Dominican Republic expatriate baseball players in the United States
Dominican Republic national baseball team players
Durham Bulls players
Elizabethton Twins players
Estrellas Orientales players
Fort Myers Miracle players
Gigantes del Cibao players
Gulf Coast Twins players
Hanwha Eagles players
KBO League pitchers
Leones del Escogido players
Minnesota Twins players
Major League Baseball pitchers
Major League Baseball players from the Dominican Republic
Mexican League baseball pitchers
New Britain Rock Cats players
Quad Cities River Bandits players
Reno Aces players
Rieleros de Aguascalientes players
Rochester Red Wings players
Rojos del Águila de Veracruz players
St. Paul Saints players
Sugar Land Skeeters players
Tiburones de La Guaira players
York Revolution players
2015 WBSC Premier12 players
Dominican Republic expatriate baseball players in Venezuela